This is a comprehensive listing of official releases by Jamaican dancehall singer Sean Paul.

Stage One is the debut album by Paul, released on 28 March 2000. Putting the CD in a CD-ROM drive gives access to the "Haffi Get De Gal Ha (Hot Gal Today)" music video and a link to the 2 Hard Records website. It sold over 500,000 copies. Dutty Rock, Paul's second album was released on 12 November 2002 and was his commercial breakthrough, featuring two US number 1 singles, "Get Busy" and Beyoncé's "Baby Boy", which Sean Paul features on. It also features the singles "Gimme the Light", "Like Glue" and "I'm Still in Love with You", which all charted in the top 10 of the UK Singles Chart. The album itself reached number 2 on the UK Albums Chart, and number 9 on the US Billboard 200 albums chart.

The Trinity is Paul's third album and was released in the United States by Atlantic Records on 27 September 2005. The album was preceded by the single "We Be Burnin'", which was released to radio on 22 August 2005. The music video for the single was directed by Jessy Terrero, who has also directed videos for singles by musicians such as Wisin & Yandel, 50 Cent, Young Jeezy, and Chingy. It was featured on the Black Entertainment Television series Access Granted on 17 August 2005 and premiered online on 18 August 2005 at MTV.com. The single itself peaked at number two on the UK Singles Chart. It also peaked at number six on the US Billboard Hot 100, and seventeen on Billboards R&B/Hip-Hop chart.

Paul's fourth album, Imperial Blaze, was released on 18 August 2009. The album was certified gold in France, debuting at number 8 in that country, number 5 in Canada, number 4 in Switzerland, and number 17 in Germany. It was also the first ever Jamaican album to debut atop the Billboard Rap Albums chart. The wholly Jamaican-produced project debuted atop the Billboard Reggae chart, and at number 3 on the R&B/Hip Hop Albums chart and number 12 on the Billboard 200.

Paul's fifth album, Tomahawk Technique, was released through Atlantic Records (Warner Music Group) on 27 January 2012. His sixth album, Full Frequency, was released on 14 February 2014.

Paul's EP, Mad Love the Prequel, was released on 29 June 2018, preceded by his contributions to US number one hit "Cheap Thrills" (Sia featuring Sean Paul), international hit single "Rockabye" (Clean Bandit featuring Anne-Marie and Sean Paul), as well as his own top ten UK hit "No Lie" (featuring the Youngest  English-Albanian singer Dua Lipa), the EP's lead single.

Albums

Studio albums

Compilation albums

Mixtapes

Live albums

Extended plays

Singles

As lead artist

As featured artist

Collaborations

Music videos

Notes

References

External links
 allseanpaul.com — official website
 Atlantic Records — official website for Atlantic Records

Discographies of Jamaican artists
Reggae discographies
Hip hop discographies